Frank Löning (born 28 August 1981) is a German former professional footballer who played as a forward.

Club career
Löning was born in Aurich. In January 2015, he left 2. Bundesliga side Erzgebirge Aue after one year and joined nearby 3. Liga club Chemnitzer FC. He signed for Chemnitz until summer 2016.

In April 2017, he announced his retirement from professional football citing an unsatisfactory healing process following a heel injury. He agreed to the termination of his contract as of 31 March. In March 2023, he was named interim manager of VfB Oldenburg for one game.

References

External links

1981 births
Living people
People from Aurich
Association football forwards
Footballers from Lower Saxony
German footballers
SpVg Aurich players
Kickers Emden players
SV Wilhelmshaven players
SV Werder Bremen II players
SC Paderborn 07 players
SV Sandhausen players
FC Erzgebirge Aue players
Chemnitzer FC players
Rot-Weiss Essen players
VfB Oldenburg managers
2. Bundesliga players
3. Liga players
Regionalliga players
3. Liga managers